Eduard Peročević, better known as Edo Peročević (December 3, 1937 in Sarajevo, Yugoslavia – April 28, 2007 in Zagreb, Croatia) was a Croatian actor, best known for the role of the ticket collector in the 1976 children's film Vlak u snijegu.

Peročević was also known for his distinct voice, which helped him establish a successful career as a radio announcer.

External links

Croatian male actors
1937 births
2007 deaths